The seventeenth season of the One Piece anime series was produced by Toei Animation, and directed by Hiroaki Miyamoto and Toshinori Fukuzawa. The season began broadcasting in Japan on Fuji Television from January 19, 2014 to June 19, 2016. It features 118 episodes, which makes this the second longest season of the whole anime. Like the rest of the series, it follows the adventures of Monkey D. Luffy and his Straw Hat Pirates. The first DVD compilation of this season was released on July 2, 2014, with individual volumes being released monthly. Funimation began releasing their English dub of the season through VOD on December 1, 2020.

The story arc, called "Dressrosa", adapts material beginning from the end of the 70th volume to the middle of the 80th volume of the manga by Eiichiro Oda. The Straw Hats land in Dressrosa, an island controlled by the warlord Donquixote Doflamingo. Upon learning of Doflamingo's conquering of the kingdom, the Straw Hats team up with the Revolutionaries and the kingdom's deposed princess Viola to overthrow Doflamingo and save Dressrosa. 

This season makes use of two pieces of theme music. The opening themes are "Wake up!", sung by AAA for the first 57 episodes, and "Hard Knock Days", performed by Generations from Exile Tribe for the remainder of the season.



Episode list

Home releases

Japanese

English
In North America, the season was recategorized as part of "Season Eleven" for its home video release by Funimation Entertainment. Starting with this season, Funimation's releases bundle DVD and Blu-ray copies of the series.

Notes

References
General

Specific

2014 Japanese television seasons
2015 Japanese television seasons
2016 Japanese television seasons
One Piece seasons
One Piece episodes